Zafar Masud is a Pakistani banker who is the current chief executive officer (CEO) of the Bank of Punjab (BOP), having held the position since 4 April 2020. On 22 May 2020, Masud survived the crash of Pakistan International Airlines Flight 8303. The Airbus A320 operating the flight had initiated a go-around after its first landing attempt at Jinnah International Airport in Karachi, when the flight crew issued a distress call, after which the aircraft crashed into Model Colony, killing 97 of the 99 people on board. Masud sustained multiple fractures from the crash, but has been reported to be in a stable condition. Two days after the accident, Masud wrote a letter to the BOP, expressing condolences and that he would continue serving as CEO of the bank.

References 

Living people
Year of birth missing (living people)
Pakistani bankers
Survivors of aviation accidents or incidents
Pakistani chief executives